Tivadar Farkasházy (nickname "Teddy") (born 15 December 1945 in Budapest, Hungary) is a Hungarian humorist, author,  and journalist.

Biography 

He graduated at Corvinus University of Budapest majoring in economical planning/mathematics in 1969, and earned his doctoral title. He was one of the Hungarian investment bank's economists from 1969 to 1972, after that he was a journalist at a university magazine, titled "Közgazdász" ("Economist"). From 1973 he was the director of the "Vidám Színpad", later the director of the "Mikroszkóp Színpad". In 1974 he was the winner of Magyar Rádió's first humourfestival. From 1975 he was the editor of the Rádiókabaré. From 1989 he is owner, editor,  and frequent contributor to the satirical political biweekly Hócipő (Overshoe). 14 of his books have been published.

He was jailed for one night (26/27 March 2007), rather than paying a traffic fine.

Personal life 

His hobbies are soccer and chess.  He owns a holiday house in Balatonszárszó. His favorite composer is Richard Wagner. He is an avid fan of the races. His favourite horse is the Hungarian horse Overdose. Farkasházy wrote a book about this horse. His two favourite paintings were painted by Frans Hals. He likes to drink Hungarian red wine and especially the palinka.

Family 

He is married. His wife, Noémi Benedek (nickname "Mimi", after the La bohème's Mimi) is a violin-maker master (and her father is a violin-maker master too). He's got children and he's got a grandson and a granddaughter (they are twins). He is famous because of his big family (based on his stories, which he says in the Heti Hetes, he has many family members). His family members are Lippo Hertzka, Móric Farkasházi Fischer and many others.

Appearances in Heti Hetes 
He is one of the permanent members of the weekly show "Heti Hetes" (Hungarian version of 7 Tage, 7 Köpfe). He sits on the seventh place. He was in the first Heti Hetes in 1999. He's best known for his long stories. He is one of the most popular members in this show. The other members often joke about his stories, because (based on his stories) he was in so many places and many different events.

Awards 
 Winner of the Magyar Rádió's first humourfestival (1974)
 Karinthy-ring (1986)
 Opus-prize (1991)
 Hungarian Pulitzer Prize (1992)
 Maecenas-prize (1993)
 Collective (Hungarian) Pulitzer Prize (2000)

Books 
 Overdose - a veretlen 11 (2008) – The book's website
 Bobby visszatér avagy a Fischer-rejtély (2008) – The book's website
 32 figura - a sakk regénye (2007) – The book's website
 Zsokékrul – a lóverseny regénye (2006) – The book's website
 Ír Úr – avagy búcsú a kabarétól (2004) – The book's website
 A kék mauritius (2002) – The book's website
 Fülig Jimmy kiadott és kiadatlan levelei (2002)
 Hét és fél (2001)
 Hetedik (2000)
 Fülig Jimmy kiadatlan levelei (1998)
 Atlasszal Hócipőben (1995)
 Nem Értem (1994)
 Tévések végjátéka (1989)
 Mitisír a hogyishívják (1988)
 22 Bolond a Rádiókabaréból (1987)

External links 
 YouTube videos about his appearances in Heti Hetes.
 YouTube videos about his appearances in Heti Hetes (this isn't the same link as the one above!).
 Farkasházy's website

Sources and notes 

This page is (partly) translated from the Hungarian Wikipedia article.

1945 births
Living people
Hungarian journalists
Hungarian comedians
Hungarian television personalities
Corvinus University of Budapest alumni
Writers from Budapest
Hungarian people of Jewish descent